Metalmorfosis is the third studio album by Spanish heavy metal band Barón Rojo, released on May 16, 1983 by Chapa Discos.

The album was recorded at Battery Studios, in London.
It was ranked as the 107th best Rock en Español album ever according to American magazine Al Borde.
The original vinyl LP edition included a 7" single with two additional songs, "Invulnerable/Herencia letal", these songs also appeared in the early release on cassette as bonus tracks.

Track listing

Note: The tracks from the 7" single were not included on the CD re-issue of the album.

Personnel

Barón Rojo
Armando de Castro - guitar, backing vocals
Carlos de Castro - guitar, vocals
José Luis "Sherpa" Campuzano - bass and vocals
Hermes Calabria - drums

Production
Vicente "Mariskal" Romero (Chapa Discos) - producer
Nigel Green, Phil Ault - engineers
Bryan New, Matt Wallis - assistant engineers

Certifications

References

1983 albums
Barón Rojo albums
Spanish-language albums